Metacoptops is a monotypic beetle genus in the family Cerambycidae described by Stephan von Breuning in 1939. Its single species, Metacoptops fasciculata, was described by Per Olof Christopher Aurivillius in 1911.

References

Mesosini
Beetles described in 1911
Monotypic beetle genera